Cédric Chabert (born 3 December 1973) is a French former professional footballer who played as a midfielder.

Honours 
Gueugnon

 Coupe de la Ligue: 1999–2000

Lorient

 Coupe de France: 2001–02
 Coupe de la Ligue runner-up: 2001–02

References 

1973 births
Living people
Sportspeople from Ardèche
French footballers
Association football midfielders
ASOA Valence players
FC Gueugnon players
Le Mans FC players
FC Lorient players
Amiens SC players
Ligue 2 players
Ligue 1 players
Footballers from Auvergne-Rhône-Alpes